This is a list of buildings that are examples of the Art Deco architectural style Missouri, United States.

Cape Girardeau 
 2 North Fountain, Courthouse–Seminary Neighborhood Historic District, Cape Girardeau, 1940
 Broadway Theater, Broadway Commercial Historic District, Cape Girardeau, 1921
 Esquire Theater, Cape Girardeau, 1947

Columbia 
 Columbia National Guard Armory, Columbia, 1940
 Doctor's Building, Columbia, 1940s
 Metropolitan Building, Eighth and Broadway Historic District, Columbia, 1930
 National Guard Armory, Columbia, 1940

Hannibal 
 Crescent Jewelers, Hannibal, 1920s
 Fifth Street Baptist Church Welcome Center, Hannibal
 Kresge Building, Broadway District, Hannibal, 1931

Jefferson City 
 209 Adams (former A&P Grocery Store), Capitol Avenue Historic District, Jefferson City, 1939
 Prince Edward Apartments, 208 Marshall, Capitol Avenue Historic District, Jefferson City, 1930
 Tergin Apartment Building, Jefferson City, 1939

Kansas City 
 909 Walnut, Kansas City, 1931
 925 Grand, Kansas City, 1921
 Bartle Hall Pylons, Kansas City, 1994
 F. W. Woolworth Building, Kansas City, 1928
 Hotel Phillips, Kansas City
 Jackson County Courthouse, Kansas City, 1934
 Kansas City City Hall, Kansas City, 1937
 Kansas City Convention Center, Kansas City, 1994
 Kansas City Power and Light Building, Kansas City, 1931
 Katz Drug Building, Kansas City, 1938
 Municipal Auditorium, Kansas City, 1936
 National World War I Museum and Memorial, Kansas City, 1926
 St. Stephen Baptist Church, Kansas City, 1947
 Switzer School, Kansas City, 1939
 Tower Dry Cleaners and Laundry, Kansas City, 1944
 United States Courthouse and Post Office, Kansas City, 1939

St. Joseph 
 901 Jules, St. Joseph, 1950
 Benton High School, St. Joseph, 1940
 Missouri Theater and Missouri Theater Building, St. Joseph, 1927
 Regal Cinema (now furniture store), St. Joseph, 1926
 Trail Theater, St. Joseph, 1951
 United States Post Office and Courthouse, St. Joseph, 1938

St. Louis 
 A & P Food Stores Building, St. Louis, 1940
 ABC Auto Sales and Investment Company Building, St. Louis, 1927
 Continental Life Building, St. Louis, 1930
 DeBaliviere Building, St. Louis, 1928
 Fox Theatre, St. Louis, 1929
 Jewel Box, St. Louis, 1936
 Shell Building, St. Louis
 Southwestern Bell Building, St. Louis, 1926
 Tom-Boy Supermarket (now LeGrand's Market), St. Louis, 1936
 Vestal Chemical Company, St. Louis, 1920s
 Victor Creamery Company (now Vandeventer Building), St. Louis, 1935

Sedalia 
 218 Ohio, Sedalia Commercial Historic District, Sedalia
 Boonslick Regional Library, Sedalia
 Fox Theater Event Center, Sedalia, 1940
 Missouri State Fair, Sedalia, 1941
 Sedalia National Bank, 301 S. Ohio, Sedalia Commercial Historic District, Sedalia, 1929
 Uptown Theatre, 225 Ohio Street, Sedalia, 1936

Other cities 
 66 Drive-In, Carthage, 1949
 113 East Main, Fredericktown Courthouse Square Historic District, Fredericktown, 1931
 135 West Main, Fredericktown Courthouse Square Historic District, Fredericktown, 1926
 417 Logan, (former Arnold and Mills Lumber Yard), Chillicothe Commercial Historic District, Chillicothe
 Avenue Theater, Courthouse Square Historic District, West Plains, 1950
 Big Pump, Maryville, 1937
 Boots Motel, Carthage, 1939
 Clay County Courthouse, Liberty, 1936
 Daily Express Building, Kirksville, 1936
 DeKalb County Courthouse, Maysville, 1939
 Dexter Gymnasium, Dexter, 1940
 Esquire Theater, Richmond Heights, 1939
 Fayette City Park Swimming Pool, Fayette, 1940
 Glen Theatre, 1415 South Main Street, Joplin, 1937
 Hall of Waters, Excelsior Springs, 1934
 Howell County Courthouse, Courthouse Square Historic District, West Plains, 1937
 Huffman Auto Sales, Macon
 La Plata station, La Plata, 1945
 Miller-Star Opera House (now Lewis Street Playhouse), Canton, 1893
 Moberly Junior High School, Moberly, 1930
 Municipal Auditorium, Moberly, 1939
 Plaza Hotel, Trenton, 1930
 Renick School, Renick, 1943
 Ritz Theatre (now Finke Theatre), California, 1937
 Rodgers Theatre Building, Poplar Bluff, 1949
 Route Sixty Six Theater (former Newland Hotel), Downtown Webb City Historic District, Webb City, 1891 and 1925
 State Theater, Mound City, 1938
 Uptown Theatre, Carrollton, 1936
 Walt Theatre, New Haven Commercial Historic District, New Haven, 1940

See also 
 List of Art Deco architecture
 List of Art Deco architecture in the United States

References 

 "Art Deco & Streamline Moderne Buildings." Roadside Architecture.com. Retrieved 2019-01-03.
 "Art Deco Buildings in Tulsa". Tulsa Preservation Commission. 2015-05-06. Retrieved 2019-01-03.
 "Art Deco Society of Boston, Art Deco Architecture, Art Deco Information". Retrieved 2019-01-03.
 Cinema Treasures. Retrieved 2022-09-06
 "Court House Lover". Flickr. Retrieved 2022-09-06
 "New Deal Map". The Living New Deal. Retrieved 2020-12-25.
 "SAH Archipedia". Society of Architectural Historians. Retrieved 2021-11-21.

External links 
 

 
Art Deco
Art Deco architecture in Missouri
Missouri-related lists